Frank E. Gorman (March 28, 1874January 7, 1960) was a Michigan politician.

Early life
Frank E. Gorman was born on March 28, 1874, in Sanilac County, Michigan, to Scotch-Irish parents, William and Ann Gorman.

Career
Gorman served as Deputy Michigan State Treasurer from January 1, 1913, to May 22, 1919. Gorman was appointed to the position of Michigan State Treasurer by Governor Albert Sleeper in 1919. Gorman was then elected on the Republican ticket to the position on November 2, 1920. Gorman served in this capacity until 1924.

Personal life
Gorman married Clara L. Jenkins on September 29, 1898. Together, they had one daughter. Gorman was a member of the Freemasons and the Elks.

Death
Gorman died on January 7, 1960, in Lansing, Michigan. Gorman was interred at Deepdale Memorial Park in Delta Township, Michigan.

References

1874 births
1960 deaths
American Freemasons
American people of Scotch-Irish descent
People from Sanilac County, Michigan
Burials in Michigan
Michigan Republicans
State treasurers of Michigan
20th-century American politicians